Baydarovo is a rural locality (a village) and the administrative center of Baydarovskoye Rural Settlement, Nikolsky District, Vologda Oblast, Russia. The population was 148 as of 2002.

Geography 
Baydarovo is located 16 km northeast of Nikolsk (the district's administrative centre) by road. Kovyrtsevo is the nearest rural locality.

References 

Rural localities in Nikolsky District, Vologda Oblast
Nikolsky Uyezd